A.Vaikuntam was an Indian politician and former Member of the Legislative Assembly. He was elected to the Tamil Nadu legislative assembly as an Indian National Congress candidate from Srivilliputhur constituency in 1952 election. He was one of the two winners in the constituency, the other being Independent candidate D. K. Raja.

References 

Indian National Congress politicians from Tamil Nadu
Living people
Year of birth missing (living people)